"Everybody Knows" is a song recorded by Canadian country music group Prairie Oyster. It was released in 1992 as the fourth single from their third studio album, Everybody Knows. It peaked at number 8 on the RPM Country Tracks chart in October 1992.

Chart performance

Year-end charts

References

1992 singles
Prairie Oyster songs
RCA Records singles
Songs written by Paul Kennerley
Song recordings produced by Josh Leo
1991 songs
Songs written by Keith Glass